Crambus trichusalis is a moth in the family Crambidae. It was described by George Duryea Hulst in 1886. It is found in North America, where it has been recorded from Alberta, Saskatchewan, Montana, North Dakota and South Dakota. The habitat consists of grasslands.

The larvae probably feed on grasses.

References

Crambini
Moths described in 1886
Moths of North America